Brandon Penn (born June 5, 1990) is an American professional basketball player for Jászberényi KSE of the Hungarian League. He won the Danish championship with the Bakken Bears in 2014.

Professional career
During his career, Penn played in Japan, Denmark and Greece. On January 12, 2018, Penn signed with KR of the Úrvalsdeild karla. He left the club in middle of February due to family issues and did not return. In 5 games, he averaged 12.8 points and 7.0 rebounds.

References

External links
profile at balkanleague.net
profile at eurobasket.com
profile at realgm.com
profile at fiba.com
profile at espn.go.com
Greek league statistics at esake.gr

1990 births
Living people
American expatriate basketball people in Croatia
American expatriate basketball people in Denmark
American expatriate basketball people in Greece
American expatriate basketball people in Hungary
American expatriate basketball people in Iceland
American expatriate basketball people in Japan
American expatriate basketball people in North Macedonia
American expatriate basketball people in Serbia
American expatriate basketball people in Qatar
American expatriate basketball people in the United Kingdom
American men's basketball players
Apollon Patras B.C. players
Bakken Bears players
Basketball League of Serbia players
Basketball players from Philadelphia
Kagawa Five Arrows players
KR men's basketball players
KK Kolubara players
Plymouth Raiders players
Rider Broncs men's basketball players
Úrvalsdeild karla (basketball) players
Forwards (basketball)